Prospect Valley is a populated place in Weld County, Colorado, United States. The Post Office at Keenesburg serves the Prospect Valley postal address. SH 52 runs east and west through the community.

Geography
Prospect Valley is located at  (40.0735938, -104.4149556), along State Highway 52, 11 miles east of Keenesburg.

References

Populated places in Weld County, Colorado